"Every Girl" (album version titled "Every Girl in the World") is a song by rap group Young Money released as the first single from their debut collaboration album titled We Are Young Money. It was legally released to the iTunes Store on June 11, 2009. Young Money Entertainment rappers Lil Wayne, Drake, Jae Millz, Gudda Gudda, and Mack Maine make appearances on the track. The video was shot on February 13, 2009 and was released on April 6 of that same year. The song was leaked to the internet on January 28, 2009, just two days after "Prom Queen" was officially released.

A few lines of "Every Girl" are recycled from an unreleased song by Lil Wayne and Mack Maine titled "Throw it Back", which was produced by Kane Beatz.

Music video
The video for "Every Girl" was released on April 6, 2009 and features the Young Money artists and animation from humorous pop-up words and sentences and distortion of a silver Rolls-Royce Phantom in the video. Former Danity Kane member D. Woods makes a cameo appearance in the video with Birdman as well as Young Money artists Lil Chuckee and Lil Twist. The song was written by Christopher Hicks, from the NDSS incorporation.

It ranked at #12 on BET's Notarized: Top 100 Videos of 2009 countdown.

Directed by Dwayne Carter, Jeff Panzer and Kimberly Stuckwisch.[²]

Charts

Weekly charts

Year-end charts

Remixes

A remix of the song was released by Nappy Boy Entertainment featuring T-Pain, Tay Dizm, Young Cash, and Travis McCoy. The video, filmed in the NB Mansion, debuted on the Nappy Boy website.

There are also remixes of this song by R. Kelly, Tyga, Sammie, Red Cafe, Trey Songz and Kirko Bangz. Rapper Shawnna also did a freestyle to the song.

R&B singer K. Michelle released a response track titled "Fakin' It", featuring Missy Elliott.

References

External links

2009 singles
Drake (musician) songs
Cash Money Records singles
Lil Wayne songs
Songs written by Drake (musician)
Songs written by Lil Wayne
Mack Maine songs
Dirty rap songs
2007 songs
Song recordings produced by Tha Bizness
Young Money Entertainment singles